Zirconium(IV) chloride, also known as zirconium tetrachloride, is an inorganic compound frequently used as a precursor to other compounds of zirconium. This white high-melting solid hydrolyzes rapidly in humid air.

Structure
Unlike molecular TiCl4, solid ZrCl4 adopts a polymeric structure wherein each Zr is octahedrally coordinated. This difference in structures is responsible for the disparity in their properties:  is distillable, but  is a solid. In the solid state, ZrCl4 adopts a tape-like linear polymeric structure—the same structure adopted by HfCl4. This polymer degrades readily upon treatment with Lewis bases, which cleave the Zr-Cl-Zr linkages.

Synthesis
This conversion entails treatment of the oxide with carbon as the oxide "getter" in the presence of chlorine at high temperature:
ZrO2 + 2 C + 2 Cl2 → ZrCl4 + 2 CO

A laboratory scale process uses carbon tetrachloride in place of carbon and chlorine:
ZrO2 + 2 CCl4 → ZrCl4 + 2 COCl2

Applications

Precursor to Zr metal
ZrCl4 is an intermediate in the conversion of zirconium minerals to metallic zirconium by the Kroll process. In nature, zirconium minerals invariably exist as oxides (reflected also by the tendency of all zirconium chlorides to hydrolyze). For their conversion to bulk metal, these refractory oxides are first converted to the tetrachloride, which can be distilled at high temperatures. The purified ZrCl4 can be reduced with Zr metal to produce zirconium(III) chloride.

Other uses
ZrCl4 is the most common precursor for chemical vapor deposition of zirconium dioxide and zirconium diboride.

In organic synthesis zirconium tetrachloride is used as a weak Lewis acid for the Friedel-Crafts reaction, the Diels-Alder reaction and intramolecular cyclisation reactions. It is also used to make water-repellent treatment of textiles and other fibrous materials.

Properties and reactions
Hydrolysis of ZrCl4 gives the hydrated hydroxy chloride cluster called zirconyl chloride. This reaction is rapid and virtually irreversible, consistent with the high oxophilicity of zirconium(IV). For this reason, manipulations of ZrCl4 typically require air-free techniques.

ZrCl4 is the principal starting compound for the synthesis of many organometallic complexes of zirconium. Because of its polymeric structure, ZrCl4 is usually converted to a molecular complex before use. It forms a 1:2 complex with tetrahydrofuran: CAS [21959-01-3], mp 175–177 °C.  Sodium cyclopentadienide (NaC5H5) reacts with ZrCl4(THF)2 to give zirconocene dichloride, ZrCl2(C5H5)2, a versatile organozirconium complex. One of the most curious properties of  ZrCl4 is its high solubility in the presence of methylated benzenes, such as durene. This solubilization arises through the formation of π-complexes.

The log (base 10) of the vapor pressure of zirconium tetrachloride (from 480 to 689 K) is given by the equation: log10(P) = −5400/T + 11.766, where the pressure is measured in torrs and temperature in kelvins. The log (base 10) of the vapor pressure of solid zirconium tetrachloride (from 710 to 741 K) is given by the equation log10(P) = −3427/T + 9.088. The pressure at the melting point is 14,500 torrs.

References

Zirconium(IV) compounds
Chlorides
Metal halides
Coordination complexes